Kvitsøy Church is a parish church of the Church of Norway in Kvitsøy Municipality in Rogaland county, Norway. It is located just north of the village of Ydstebøhamn on the island of Kvitsøy. It is the church for the Kvitsøy parish which is part of the Tungenes prosti (deanery) in the Diocese of Stavanger. The small, white, wooden church was built in a long church design around the year 1620 using designs by an unknown architect. The church seats about 150 people.

History
The earliest existing historical records of the church date back to the year 1293, but it was not new that year. Around 1620, the old medieval church was torn down and a new church was built on the same site.  It is possible that some of the materials from the old church were reused in the new building. The altarpiece was new in 1620, but the baptismal font is dated back to around the year 1300, so it was used in the old church as well. The church has been remodeled and expanded since the original structure was built.  In the 1950s, the original rosemåling decorations on the walls were discovered and restored.

See also
List of churches in Rogaland

References

Kvitsøy
Churches in Rogaland
Wooden churches in Norway
17th-century Church of Norway church buildings
Churches completed in 1620
13th-century establishments in Norway